Malahide Cricket Club Ground or The Village is a cricket ground in Malahide, Ireland situated in the Lady Acre field of Malahide Castle grounds. The ground is owned by the Malahide Cricket Club. The ground has been developed to a capacity of 11,500 making it Ireland's biggest cricket venue and officially opened for international cricket in 2013. In November 2017, it was confirmed as the venue for Ireland's first Test match, when they played Pakistan in May 2018.

History
Malahide Cricket Club was founded in 1861. The 5th Baron Talbot of Malahide, Richard Wogan Talbot, was fond of cricket and established a cricket ground in the grounds of Malahide Castle. It would be over a century later when major cricket would first be played at Malahide, with the ground hosting a first-class match between Ireland and Scotland in 1991.

International cricket
In September 2013, International Cricket Council cleared the ground to host international cricket. The ground hosted its first international cricket match when home team Ireland played against England with England winning by six wickets after captain Eoin Morgan hit 124 not out on what had been his home ground in his youth. The capacity was designed to be increased to 11500 using temporary grandstands and hospitality tents making it the biggest in Ireland with a record attendance for the Island of Ireland of over 10,000.

The ground became Ireland's third venue for international cricket, the other two being Castle Avenue in Dublin and the Civil Service Cricket Club Ground at Stormont.

Malahide was also confirmed as the stage for two Twenty20 games against the touring South Africa A side in 2013.

It was selected as a venue to host matches in the 2015 ICC World Twenty20 Qualifier tournament.

Records

International centuries

Test centuries
In the very first Test match for Ireland, Kevin O'Brien scored the maiden Test century at the venue.

ODI centuries
16 ODI centuries have been scored at the venue.

T20I centuries

International five wicket hauls

A total of seven five-wicket hauls have been taken on the ground in international matches, including one in a Test match.

Test matches

One Day Internationals

Notes

References

See also
 Cricket Ireland Academy

External links

 Malahide Cricket Club Official Website
 Cricinfo 

Cricket grounds in the Republic of Ireland
Malahide
Sports venues in Dublin (city)
Sports venues completed in 1966
Sports venues in Fingal
Cricket grounds in County Dublin